Władysław Eugeniusz Sikorski (20 May 18814 July 1943) was a Polish military and political leader.

Prior to the First World War, Sikorski established and participated in several underground organizations that promoted the cause for Polish independence. He fought with distinction in the Polish Legions during the First World War, and later in the newly created Polish Army during the Polish–Soviet War of 1919 to 1921. In that war, he played a prominent role in the decisive Battle of Warsaw (1920). In the early years of the Second Polish Republic, Sikorski held government posts, including serving as prime minister (1922 to 1923) and as minister of military affairs (1923 to 1924). Following Józef Piłsudski's May Coup of 1926 and the installation of the Sanation government, he fell out of favor with the new régime.

During the Second World War, Sikorski became prime minister of the Polish government-in-exile, Commander-in-Chief of the Polish Armed Forces, and a vigorous advocate of the Polish cause in the diplomatic sphere. He supported the reestablishment of diplomatic relations between Poland and the Soviet Union, which had been severed after the Soviet pact with Germany and the 1939 invasion of Poland—however, Soviet leader Joseph Stalin broke off Soviet-Polish diplomatic relations in April 1943 following Sikorski's request that the International Red Cross investigate the Katyń Forest massacre.

In July 1943, a plane carrying Sikorski plunged into the sea immediately after takeoff from Gibraltar, killing all on board except the pilot. The exact circumstances of Sikorski's death have been disputed and have given rise to a number of different theories surrounding the crash and his death. Sikorski had been the most prestigious leader of the Polish exiles, and his death was a severe setback for the Polish cause.

Early life and First World War 
Sikorski was born in Tuszów Narodowy, Galicia, at the time part of the Austro-Hungarian Empire. He was the third child in his family; his father was Tomasz Sikorski, a school teacher; his mother was Emilia Habrowska. His grandfather, Tomasz Kopaszyna Sikorski, had fought and been wounded at the Battle of Olszynka Grochowska in the November Uprising, during which he received the Virtuti Militari medal.

Sikorski attended the gimnazjum in Rzeszów (now Konarski's High School in Rzeszów) from 1893 to 1897, then transferred for a year to a Rzeszów teachers' college. In 1899 he attended the Lwów Franciszek Józef Gymnasium, and in 1902 he passed his final high school exam there. Starting that year, young Sikorski studied engineering at the Lwów Polytechnic, specializing in road and bridge construction, and graduated in 1908 with a diploma in hydraulic engineering. In 1906 Sikorski volunteered for a year's service in the Austro-Hungarian army and attended the Austrian Military School, obtaining an officer's diploma and becoming an army reserve second lieutenant (podporucznik rezerwy). In 1909 he married , whom he met while at the high school in Lwów. In 1912 they had a daughter, Zofia. After graduation he lived in Leżajsk and worked for the Galician administration's hydraulic engineering department, working on the regulation of the San river, and later was involved in private enterprises related to construction, real estate and the petroleum trade.

During his studies at the Polytechnic, Sikorski became involved in the People's School Association (Towarzystwo Szkoły Ludowej), an organization dedicated to spreading literacy among the rural populace. Around 1904–1905 he was briefly involved with the endecja Association of the Polish Youth "Zet", and then drifted towards paramilitary socialist organizations related to the Polish Socialist Party, which was intent on securing Polish independence. He made contact with the socialist movement around 1905–1906 through the Union for the Resurrection of the Polish Nation (Związek Odrodzenia Narodu Polskiego). In 1908, in Lwów, Sikorski—together with Józef Piłsudski, Marian Kukiel, Walery Sławek, Kazimierz Sosnkowski,  and Henryk Minkiewicz—organized the secret Union for Active Struggle (Związek Walki Czynnej), with the aim of bringing about an uprising against the Russian Empire, one of Poland's three partitioners. In 1910, likewise in Lwów, Sikorski helped to organize a Riflemen's Association (the Związek Strzelecki), became the president of its Lwów chapter, and became responsible for the military arm within the Commission of Confederated Independence Parties (Komisja Skonfederowanych Stronnictw Niepodległościowych, KSSN). Having a military education, he lectured other activists on military tactics.

Upon the outbreak of the First World War in July 1914, Sikorski was mobilized, but through KSSN influence he was allowed to participate in the organizing of the Polish military units, rather than being delegated to other duties by the Austro-Hungarian military command. In the first few weeks of the war he became the chief of the Military Department in the Supreme National Committee (Naczelny Komitet Narodowy, NKN) and remained in this post until 1916. He was a commissioner in charge of the recruitment to the Polish Legions in Kraków, choosing this role over the opportunity to serve in the Legions as a frontline commander. On 30 September 1914 he was promoted to podpułkownik (lieutenant colonel), and soon after that he became the commander of a Legions officer school (Szkoła Podchorążych). The Legions—the army created by Józef Piłsudski to liberate Poland from Russian and, ultimately, Austro-Hungarian and German rule—initially fought in alliance with Austria-Hungary against Russia. From August 1915 there was growing tension between Sikorski, who advocated cooperation with Austria-Hungary, and Piłsudski, who felt that Austria-Hungary and Germany had betrayed the trust of the Polish people. In 1916 Piłsudski actively campaigned to have the Military Department of NKN disbanded. In July that year, Sikorski was promoted to pułkownik (colonel). Following the Act of 5th November (1916), Sikorski became involved with the Legions' alternatives, the Polish Auxiliary Corps and Polnische Wehrmacht. In June 1917 Piłsudski refused Austro-Hungarian orders to swear loyalty to the Habsburg Emperor (the "oath crisis") and was interned at the fortress of Magdeburg, while Sikorski abandoned Polnische Wehrmacht and returned to the Austro-Hungarian Army. In 1918, however, following the February Treaty of Brest-Litovsk and the battle of Rarańcza, Sikorski chose belatedly to side with Piłsudski, announcing solidarity with his actions, protesting against the planned separation of Chełm Land from the planned Polish state, and thus soon joined Piłsudski in internment (he would be held in Dulfalva (Dulovo)). Nonetheless, this was not enough to smooth the differences between him and Piłsudski, and these two major Polish leaders would drift farther apart in the continuing years.

War with the Bolsheviks

Polish–Ukrainian war 

In 1918 the Russian, Austro-Hungarian and German empires collapsed, and Poland once again became independent, but the borders of the Second Polish Republic were not fully determined and were unstable. In the east they would be formed in the escalating conflicts among Polish, Ukrainian, Lithuanian and Soviet forces in what culminated in the Polish–Soviet War (1919–1921). Winston Churchill commented: "The war of giants has ended, the wars of the pygmies began." Bolshevik leaders saw Poland as a bridge that the communist revolution would have to force to bring communism to the West, and Poland's very existence would soon be at stake.

Polish–Soviet war 
After his release from internment, from 1 May 1918 Sikorski worked for the Regency Council, organizing the new Polish Army. He was soon at the frontlines again, this time in the Polish–Ukrainian War, where troops under his command secured and defended Przemyśl in October–November 1918.

Polish independence came in November 1918 with the formation of the Second Republic of Poland. In the course of the Polish–Ukrainian War, and in the opening phase of the Polish–Soviet War, Sikorski, now a high-ranking officer of the Polish Army was involved in further operations in the Galicia region. In January 1919 he commanded troops defending Gródek Jagielloński; in March that year he commanded an infantry division, advancing to Stawczany and Zbrucz. From 1 August 1918 Sikorski commanded the Polesie Group, and the Polish 9th Infantry Division. In order to curtail excesses of the forces under his command, he oversaw trials of 36 officers. His forces took Mozyr and Kalenkowicze in March 1920, and he would command the Polesie Group during Poland's Kiev offensive in April 1920, advancing to the Dnieper River and the Chernobyl region. On 1 April that year he was promoted to brigade general. 

As the Polish–Soviet War grew in intensity, in late April 1920 the Red Army of Russia's new Soviet regime pushed back Polish forces and invaded Poland. Subsequently, Sikorski successfully defended Mozyr and Kalenkowicze until 29 June, but later failed to hold the Brest fortress, although he defended it long enough to allow the Polish forces in the region to retreat in an orderly manner. On 6 August he was named the commander of the newly formed Polish 5th Army, which was tasked with holding the front to the north of Modlin, between Narew and Wkra rivers. He distinguished himself commanding the 5th Army on the Lower Vistula front during the Battle of Warsaw. At that time Soviet forces, expecting an easy final victory, were surprised and crippled by the Polish counter-attack. During that battle (sometimes referred to as "the Miracle at the Vistula") Sikorski stopped the Bolshevik advance north of Warsaw and gave Piłsudski, the Polish commander-in-chief, the time he needed for his counter-offensive; beginning with the 15 August his forces successfully engaged the Soviet 5th and 15th Armies. After the Battle of Warsaw, from 30 August, Sikorski commanded the 3rd Army. His forces took Pińsk, and fought during the latter stages of the Battle of Lwów and the Battle of Zamość, and then after Battle of Niemen advanced with his forces toward Latvia and deep into Belarus. The Poles defeated the Soviets, and the Polish–Soviet Treaty of Riga (March 1921) gave Poland substantial areas of Belarus and Ukraine's (Kresy). Sikorski's fame was enhanced as he became known to the Polish public as one of the heroes of the Polish–Soviet War. He also kept publishing military science articles during the war itself. For his valorous achievements Sikorski was promoted to divisional general on 28 February 1921, and was awarded Poland's highest military decoration, the order of Virtuti Militari, on 15 March that year.

In government and in opposition 

Despite their differences, Piłsudski praised Sikorski in his reports, recommending him for Chief of the General Staff and minister of war positions; only generals Kazimierz Sosnkowski and Edward Rydz-Śmigły received better evaluations from him. Sikorski was popular among many soldiers, and in politics, particularly appealing to Polish conservatives and liberals. On 1 April 1921 Sikorski replaced general Tadeusz Jordan-Rozwadowski as the chief of the Polish General Staff. Between 1922 and 1925 he held a number of high government offices. Based on his analysis, the Polish Council of Ministers adopted new foreign policy that would remain roughly unchanged until the late 1930s (preserving the status quo in Europe, and treating Germany and Russia as equal sources of potential threat). On 12 December 1922 he issued a general order, stressing the need for the military to stay out of politics. After the assassination of President of Poland Gabriel Narutowicz on 16 December 1922, the Marshal of the Sejm (Sejm being the Polish parliament), Maciej Rataj, appointed Sikorski prime minister.  From 18 December 1922, to 26 May 1923, Sikorski served as prime minister and also as minister of internal sffairs, and was even considered as possible president.  During his brief tenure as prime minister, he became popular with the Polish public and carried out essential reforms in addition to guiding the country's foreign policy in a direction that gained the approval and cooperation of the League of Nations and tightened Polish-French cooperation. He obtained recognition of Poland's eastern frontiers from the UK, France and the United States during the Conference of Ambassadors on 15 March 1923 He aided Treasury Minister Władysław Grabski's reforms aiming at curtailing inflation and reforming the currency and supported ethnic minorities. His government nonetheless lost support in the Sejm and resigned on 26 May 1923.

From 30 September 1923 to 1924 he held the post of chief inspector of infantry (Generalny Inspektor Piechoty). From 17 February 1924 to 1925, under Prime Minister Grabski, he was minister of military affairs and guided the modernization of the Polish military; he also created the Korpus Ochrony Pogranicza. He worked actively to promote the cause of the Polish-French military alliance. His proposal to increase the powers of the minister of military affairs while reducing those of the Chief Inspector of the Armed Forces met with sharp disapproval from Piłsudski, who at that time was gathering many opponents of the current government. From 1925 to 1928 Sikorski commanded Military Corps District (Okręg Korpusu) VI in Lwów.

A democrat and supporter of the Sejm, Sikorski declared his opposition to Józef Piłsudski's May coup d'état in 1926; however he remained in Lwów, refused to dispatch his forces, and played no significant role in the short struggle surrounding the coup. In 1928 he was relieved by Piłsudski of his command, and while he remained on active service, he received no other posting. That year also saw the publication of his book on the Polish–Soviet War, Nad Wisłą i Wkrą. Studium do polsko–radzieckiej wojny 1920 roku (At the Vistula and the Wkra Rivers: a Contribution to the Study of the Polish–Soviet War of 1920). He would spend the following years studying military theory, publishing works on military theory, history and foreign policy. His most famous work was his 1934 book Przyszła wojnajej możliwości i charakter oraz związane z nimi zagadnienia obrony kraju (lit. War in the Future: Its Capacities and Character and Associated Questions of National Defense, published in English in as Modern warfare. Its character, its problems in 1943), in which he predicted the return of the maneuver warfare.  He wrote several other books and many articles, foreseeing, among other things, the rapid militarization of Germany.

In due course, soon after he was relieved of his command, and as a semi-dictatorial Sanacja regime was established, Sikorski joined the anti-Piłsudski opposition. Sikorski largely withdrew from politics, spending much of his time in Paris, France, and working with the French Ecole Superieure de Guerre (war college). Even after the death of Piłsudski in 1935, he was still marginalized, politically and militarily, by Piłsudski's successors. In February next year, together with several prominent Polish politicians (Wincenty Witos, Ignacy Paderewski, and General Józef Haller) he joined the Front Morges, an anti-Sanacja political grouping.

Prime Minister in exile 

In the days before Poland was invaded by Germany in September 1939, and during the invasion itself, Sikorski's request for a military command continued to be denied by the Polish commander in chief, Marshal Edward Rydz-Śmigły. Sikorski escaped through Romania to Paris, where on 28 September he joined Władysław Raczkiewicz and Stanisław Mikołajczyk in a Polish government-in-exile, taking command of the newly formed Polish Armed Forces in France. Two days later, on 30 September, president Raczkiewicz called him to serve as the first Polish prime minister in exile. On 7 November he became commander in chief and General Inspector of the Armed Forces (Naczelny Wódz i Generalny Inspektor Sił Zbrojnych), following Rydz-Śmigły's resignation. Sikorski would also hold the position of the Polish Minister of Military Affairs, thus uniting in his person all control over the Polish military in wartime.

During his years as prime minister in exile, Sikorski personified the hopes and dreams of millions of Poles, as reflected in the saying, "When the sun is higher, Sikorski is nearer" (Polish: "Gdy słoneczko wyżej, to Sikorski bliżej"). At the same time, from early on he had to work to reconcile the pro- and anti-Piłsudski's factions.

His government was recognized by the western Allies. Nonetheless, Sikorski's government struggled to get its point of view heard by France and the United Kingdom. The western Allies refused to recognize the Soviet Union as an aggressor, despite the Soviet invasion of Poland on 17 September 1939. Furthermore, he struggled to secure resources needed to recreate the Polish Army in exile.

Poland, even with its territories occupied, still commanded substantial armed forces: the Polish Navy had sailed to Britain, and many thousands of Polish troops had escaped via Romania and Hungary or across the Baltic Sea. Those routes would be used until the end of the war by both interned soldiers and volunteers from Poland, who jocularly called themselves "Sikorski's tourists" and embarked on their dangerous journeys, braving death or imprisonment in concentration camps if caught by the Germans or their allies. With the steady flow of recruits, the new Polish Army was soon reassembled in France and in French-mandated Syria. In addition to that, Poland had a large resistance movement, and Sikorski's policies included founding of the Związek Walki Zbrojnej (Union of Armed Struggle), later transformed into Armia Krajowa (Home Army), and creation of the Government Delegation for Poland position, to supervise the Polish Underground State in occupied Poland.

In 1940 the Polish Highland Brigade took part in the Battle of Narvik (Norway), and two Polish divisions participated in the defense of France, while a Polish motorized brigade and two infantry divisions were in process of forming. A Polish Independent Carpathian Brigade was created in French-mandated Syria. The Polish Air Force in France had 86 aircraft with one and a half of the squadrons fully operational, and the remaining two and a half in various stages of training. Although many Polish personnel had died in the fighting or had been interned in Switzerland following the fall of France, General Sikorski refused French Marshal Philippe Pétain's proposal of a Polish capitulation to Germany. On 19 June 1940, Sikorski met with British Prime Minister Winston Churchill and promised that Polish forces would fight alongside the British until final victory. Sikorski and his government moved to London and were able to evacuate many Polish troops to Britain. After the signing of a Polish-British Military Agreement on 5 August 1940, they proceeded to build up and train the Polish Armed Forces in the West. Experienced Polish pilots took part in the Battle of Britain, where the Polish 303 Fighter Squadron achieved the highest number of kills of any Allied squadron. Sikorski's Polish forces would form one of the most significant Allied contingents.

The Fall of France weakened Sikorski's position, and his proposal to consider building a new Polish army in the Soviet-occupied territories led to much criticism from within the Polish community in exile. On 19 July Raczkiewicz dismissed him from his position as the prime minister, replacing him with August Zaleski; however, within days pressure from Sikorski's sympathizers, including the British government, made Raczkiewicz reconsider his decision, and Sikorski was reinstated as the prime minister on 25 July.

One of Sikorski's political goals was the creation of a Central and Eastern European federation, starting with the Polish-Czechoslovakian confederation. He saw such an organization as necessary if smaller states were to stand up to traditional German and Russian imperialism. That concept, although ultimately futile, gained some traction around that time, as Sikorski and Edvard Beneš from the Czechoslovak government-in-exile, signed an agreement declaring the intent to pursue closer cooperation on 10 November that year. On 24 December 1940 Sikorski was promoted to generał broni. In March 1941 he visited the United States; he would visit the US again in March and December 1942.

Following the German invasion of the Soviet Union ("Operation Barbarossa") in June 1941, Sikorski opened negotiations with the Soviet ambassador to London, Ivan Maisky, to re-establish diplomatic relations between Poland and the Soviet Union, which had been broken off after the Soviet invasion of Poland in September 1939. In December that year, Sikorski went to Moscow with a diplomatic mission. The Polish Government reached an agreement with the Soviet Union (the Sikorski-Maisky Pact of 17 August 1941), confirmed by Joseph Stalin in December of that year. Stalin agreed to invalidate the September 1939 Soviet-German partition of Poland, declare the Russo-German Molotov–Ribbentrop Pact of August 1939 null and void, and release tens of thousands of Polish prisoners-of-war held in Soviet camps. Pursuant to an agreement between the Polish government-in-exile and Stalin, the Soviets granted "amnesty" to many Polish citizens, from whom a new army (the Polish II Corps) was formed under General Władysław Anders and later evacuated to the Middle East, where Britain faced a dire shortage of military forces. The whereabouts of thousands more Polish officers, however, would remain unknown for two more years, and this would weigh heavily on both Polish–Soviet relations and on Sikorski's fate.

Initially, Sikorski supported the Polish–Soviet rapprochement, which reignited criticism of his person from some Polish factions. Nonetheless, Sikorski soon realized that the Soviet Union had plans for Polish territories, which would be unacceptable to Polish public. The Soviets began their diplomatic offensive after their first major military victory in the Battle of Moscow, and intensified this policy after the battle of Stalingrad, showing less and less regard for their deals with Poland. In January 1942 British diplomat Stafford Cripps informed General Sikorski that while Stalin planned to extend Polish borders to the west, by giving Poland Germany's East Prussia, he also wanted to considerably push Poland's eastern frontier westwards, along the lines of the Versailles concept of the Curzon Line, and acquire Lwów and Wilno, if not both. Sikorksi's stance on eastern borders was not inflexible; he noted in some documents that some concessions might be acceptable, however, giving up both Lwów and Wilno was not. Initially he also referred to plans of annexing German land to the Oder as megalomania.

Katyn revelation and death 

In 1943 the fragile relations between the Soviet Union and the Polish government-in-exile finally reached their breaking point when, on 13 April, the Germans announced via the Katyn Commission the discovery of the bodies of 20,000 Polish officers who had been murdered by the Soviets and buried in Katyn Forest, near Smolensk, Russia. Stalin claimed that the atrocity had been carried out by the Germans, while Nazi propaganda orchestrated by Joseph Goebbels successfully exploited the Katyn massacre to drive a wedge between Poland, the Western Allies and the Soviet Union. The Soviet Union, and subsequently Russia, did not acknowledge responsibility for this and similar massacres of Polish officers until the 1990s.

When Sikorski refused to accept the Soviet explanation and requested an investigation by the International Red Cross on 16 April, the Soviets accused the government-in-exile of cooperating with Nazi Germany and broke off diplomatic relations on 25 April.

Beginning in late May 1943, Sikorski began visiting Polish forces stationed in the Middle East. In addition to inspecting the forces and raising morale, Sikorski was also occupied with political matters; around that time, a conflict was growing between him and General Władysław Anders, as Sikorski was still open to some normalization of Polish–Soviet relations, to which Anders was vehemently opposed. On 4 July 1943, while Sikorski was returning from an inspection of Polish forces deployed in the Middle East, he was killed, together with his daughter, his chief of staff, Tadeusz Klimecki, and seven others, when his plane, a Liberator II, serial AL523, crashed into the sea 16 seconds after takeoff from Gibraltar Airport at 23:07 hours. The crash was attributed to cargo on the plane shifting to the back upon takeoff. Only the pilot, Eduard Prchal (1911–1984), survived the crash. Sikorski was subsequently buried in a brick-lined grave at the Polish War Cemetery in Newark-on-Trent, England on 16 July that year. Winston Churchill delivered a eulogy at his funeral. On 14 September 1993, his remains were exhumed and transferred via Polish Air Force TU-154M, and escorted by RAF 56 Sqn Tornado F3 jets, to the royal crypts at Wawel Castle in Kraków, Poland.

Aftermath and remembrance 

Immediately after the crash, a Polish officer who had witnessed the event from the airstrip began sobbing quietly and repeating: "Now Poland is lost! Now Poland is lost!" ("To Polska stracona!") General Sikorski's death marked a turning point for Polish influence amongst the Anglo-American allies. No Pole after him would have much sway with the Allied politicians. Sikorski had been the most prestigious leader of the Polish exiles and his death was a severe setback for the Polish cause. After the Soviets had broken off diplomatic relations with Sikorski's government in April 1943, in May and June Stalin had recalled several Soviet ambassadors for "consultations": Maxim Litvinov from Washington, Fyodor Gusev from Montreal, and Ivan Maisky from London.  While Churchill had been publicly supportive of Sikorski's government, reminding Stalin of his pact with Nazi Germany in 1939 and their joint attack on Poland, in secret consultations with Roosevelt he admitted that some concessions would have to be made by Poland to appease the powerful Soviets. The Polish–Soviet crisis was beginning to threaten cooperation between the western Allies and the Soviet Union at a time when the Poles' importance to the western Allies, essential in the first years of the war, was beginning to fade with the entry into the conflict of the military and industrial giants, the Soviet Union and the United States.

The Allies had no intention of allowing Sikorski's successor, Stanisław Mikołajczyk, to threaten the alliance with the Soviets. No representative of the Polish government was invited to the Tehran Conference or the Yalta Conference (4–11 February 1945), the two crucial events in which the Western Allies and the Soviet Union discussed the shape of the post-war world and decided on the fate of Poland. Only four months after Sikorski's death, in November 1943, at Tehran, Churchill and Roosevelt agreed with Stalin that the whole of Poland east of the Curzon Line would be ceded to the Soviets. In Teheran, neither Churchill nor Roosevelt objected to Stalin's suggestion that the Polish government in exile in London was not representing Polish interests; as historian Anita Prażmowska noted, "this spelled the end of that government's tenuous influence and raison d'être." After the Teheran Conference, Stalin decided to create his own puppet government for Poland, and a Committee of National Liberation (PKWN) was proclaimed in the summer of 1944. The committee was recognized by the Soviet Government as the only legitimate authority in Poland, while Mikołajczyk's Government in London, was termed by the Soviets an "illegal and self-styled authority." Mikołajczyk would serve in the prime minister's role until 24 November 1944, when, realizing the increasing powerlessness of the government in exile, he resigned and was succeeded by Tomasz Arciszewski, "whose obscurity", in the words of historian Mieczysław B. Biskupski, "signaled the arrival of the government in exile at total inconsequentiality." Stalin soon began a campaign for recognition by the Western Allies of a Soviet-backed Polish government led by Wanda Wasilewska, a dedicated communist with a seat in the Supreme Soviet, with General Zygmunt Berling, commander of the 1st Polish Army in Russia, as commander-in-chief of all Polish Armed Forces. By the time of the Potsdam conference in 1945, Poland has been relegated to the Soviet sphere of influence; an abandonment of the Polish government in exile that has led to the rise of the Western betrayal concept.

A number of poems dedicated to Sikorski were written by Polish authors during the war. In its aftermath, in the People's Republic of Poland, Sikorski's historic role, like that of all the adherents of the London government, would be minimized and distorted by propaganda, and those loyal to the government-in-exile would be liable to imprisonment and even execution. In time, restrictions on discussing Sikorski began to ease; on a centennial anniversary of his birth in 1981, commemorative events were held on the Rzeszów Voivodeship, including an academic conference, and revealing of plaques in Nisko and Leżajsk.  published a novel on him, Wejście w mrok (1971), and in 1983 a movie, Katastrofa w Gibraltarze by Bohdan Poręba, was made. The Polish government-in-exile, of which Sikorski was the first prime minister, would continue in existence until the end of communist rule in Poland in 1990, when Lech Wałęsa became the first post-communist president of Poland. In 1995, Sikorski became the patron of the newly formed Polish 9th Mechanized Brigade. In 2003, the Polish parliament (Sejm) declared the year (60th anniversary of Sikorski's death) to be the "Year of General Sikorski". A number of streets and schools in Poland bear Sikorski's name.

Memory of General Sikorski was also preserved both in Poland and abroad, by organizations like the Sikorski Institute in London. In the UK, Sikorski received honoris causa degrees from the University of Liverpool and University of St Andrews. In 1981, a commemorative plaque was revealed at Hotel Rubens in London, where during the war Polish Military Headquarters, including Sikorski's office, were located. He is commemorated in London's Portland Place, near the Embassy of Poland, with a larger than life statue, unveiled in 2000. A propeller from the plane in which he died is the centrepiece of a new memorial to Sikorski at Europa Point, Gibraltar.

Controversy surrounding his death 

A British Court of Inquiry convened on 7 July 1943, investigated the crash of Sikorski's Liberator II serial AL 523, but was unable to determine the cause, finding only that it was an accident and "due to jamming of elevator controls", noting that "it has not been possible to determine how the jamming occurred but it has been established that there was no sabotage.". The Polish government refused to endorse this report, due to the contradiction about the cause not being determined but sabotage being ruled out.

The political context of the event, coupled with a variety of curious circumstances (for instance, the Soviet agent Kim Philby was head of counter-intelligence for MI6 in Gibraltar at the time), immediately gave rise to numerous speculation that Sikorski's death had been no accident, and may have been the direct result of a Soviet, British, or even Polish conspiracy. Some modern sources note that the accident is not fully explained. However, as Roman Wapiński noted in his biographical entry on Sikorski in the Polish Biographical Dictionary in 1997, no conclusive evidence of any wrongdoing has been found, and Sikorski's official cause of death is listed as an accident.

In 2008 Sikorski was exhumed and his remains were examined by Polish scientists, who in 2009 concluded that he died due to injuries consistent with an air crash and that there was no evidence that Sikorski was murdered, ruling out theories that he was shot or strangled before the incident; however they did not rule out the possibility of sabotage, which is still being investigated by the Polish Institute of National Remembrance. , the investigation continues.

Honours and awards 

:
  Order of the White Eagle (posthumously in 1943)
 Commander of the Virtuti Militari (1923)
 Silver Cross of the Virtuti Militari  (1921)
 Grand Cross of the Order of Polonia Restituta (1923)
 Commander's Cross of the Order of Polonia Restituta (1921)
 Order of the Cross of Grunwald, 1st class (posthumously in 1946 by the State National Council)
 Cross of Valour, four times
 Gold Cross of Merit
 Cross of Independence 
 Cross of Merit of the Central Lithuanian Army
 Commemorative Medal for the War of 1918–1921
 Medal of the Decade of Regained Independence
Other countries:
 Military Merit Cross (Austria-Hungary)
 Commemorative Cross of Mobilization 1912–1913 (Austria-Hungary)
 Grand Officer of the Order of Leopold (Belgium)
 Order of the White Lion (Czechoslovakia)
 Czechoslovak War Cross 1939–1945 (Czechoslovakia)
 Czechoslovak War Cross 1918 (Czechoslovakia)
 Cross of Liberty for Military Leadership (Estonia)
 Cross of Liberty for Personal Courage (Estonia)
  Grand Cross of the White Rose of Finland (Finland)
 Commander of the White Rose of Finland (Finland)
 Grand Cross of the Legion of Honour (France)
 Commander of the Legion of Honour (France)
 Knight Grand Cross of the Order of the Crown of Italy (Italy)
 Order of the Rising Sun, 2nd Class, Gold and Silver Star (Japan)
  Grand Officer of the Order of the Three Stars (Latvia)
  Grand Cross of the Order of the Aztec Eagle (Mexico)
  War Cross with Sword (Norway)
  Grand Cross of the Order of the Star of Romania (Romania)
 Grand Cross of the Order of the Crown (Romania)
 Commander of the Order of St. Sava (Yugoslavia)
 Grand Cross of the Order of the White Eagle (Yugoslavia)

Works 
General Sikorski was also an active writer on the subjects of military tactics and describing his personal war experiences. His works include:

 Regulamin musztry Związku Strzeleckiego i elementarna taktyka piechoty (Drill Regulations of the Riflemen's Association and Basic Infantry Tactics), 1911.
 Nad Wisłą i Wkrą. Studium do polsko–radzieckiej wojny 1920 roku (At the Vistula and the Wkra Rivers: a Contribution to the Study of the Polish–Soviet War of 1920), 1923; latest edition, Warsaw, 1991.
 O polską politykę państwową. Umowy i deklaracje z okresu pełnienia urzędu prezesa Rady Ministrów 18 XII 1922–26 V 1923 (Polish National Policies: Agreements and Declarations from My Tenure as Prime Minister, 18 December 1922 to 26 May 1923), 1923.
 Podstawy organizacji naczelnych władz wojskowych w Polsce (Basic Organization of the Supreme Military Authorities in Poland), 1923.
 Polesie jako węzeł strategiczny wschodniego frontu (Polesie as a Strategic Node of the Eastern Front), 1924.
 La campagne polono-russe de 1920 (French: The Polish-Russian Campaign of 1920), 1928.
 Polska i Francja w przeszłości i w dobie współczesnej (Poland and France in the Past and in the Present Day), 1931.
 Przyszła wojnajej możliwości i charakter oraz związane z nimi zagadnienia obrony kraju (War in the Future: Its Capacities and Character and Associated Questions of National Defense), 1934; translated into French in 1934, and into in 1943; latest edition Warsaw, MON, 1972.

Some of his works have been collected in:

 Generał Władysław Sikorski: Publicystyka generała Władysława Sikorskiego na łamach Kuriera Warszawskiego w latach 1928–1939 (General Władysław Sikorski: Articles by General Władysław Sikorski in the Warsaw Courier, 1928–1939), Oficyna Wydawnicza Aspra, 1999, .

See also 

 Międzymorze – World War II and since
 Prometheism – Second period (1921–23)

Notes 
a  For a detailed analysis of the size of Polish forces, in comparison to other allies, see note a in the Polish contribution to World War II article.

References

Further reading 
  Baluk, Stefan and Terry A. Tegnazian. Sikorski: No Simple Soldier: A Visual History of World War II's Unsung Allied Leader (2014)
 Coutouvidis, John and Jaime Reynolds. Poland, 1939–1947 (1986) 424 pages online
 Gelli, Frank Julian. The Dark Side of England (2014) , https://www.amazon.co.uk/Dark-England-Frank-Julian-Gelli-ebook/dp/B00QJ19TXI
  Korpalska, Walentyna. Wadysaw Eugeniusz Sikorski: Biografia polityczna (2nd ed. 1988), the standard biography in Google
 Peszke, Michael Alfred, The Polish Underground Army, the Western Allies, and the Failure of Strategic Unity in World War II, foreword by Piotr S. Wandycz, (Jefferson, NC, McFarland & Company, 2005)
 Ponichtera, R.M.  "The Military Thought of Wladyslaw Sikorski," Journal of Military History (1995) 59#2 pp. 279–301; wide-ranging overview with survey of the historiography on pp. 280–82
 Rozek,  Edward J. Allied Wartime Diplomacy: A Pattern in Poland (1958) online
  Sword, Keith, ed. Sikorski: Soldier and Statesman (1990) important essays by scholars in Google
 Terry, Sarah Meiklejohn, Poland's Place in Europe: General Sikorski and the Origin of the Oder-Neisse Line, 1939–1943, (Princeton University Press, 1983), online at ACLS e-books
 Waszak, Leon, and P. Lang, "Agreement in Principle: the Wartime Partnership of General Wladyslaw Sikorski and Winston Churchill," Studies in Modern European History, vol. 20, April 1996, 
 Whiteley, Justin, Smierc Generala Sikorskiego, Bellona, 2007, 
 Woodward, Llewellyn. British Foreign Policy in the Second World War (1971) vol 2 pp. 612–662

Other sources 
 Dead Men's Secrets the Mysterious Death of General Sikorski, The History Channel DVD, 
 Generał Sikorski, premier, naczelny wodz (General Sikorski: Prime Minister, Commander in Chief), London, Polish Institute and Sikorski Museum, 1981, .

External links 

 Polish Radio podcast on the subject of Sikorski's death. 
 Polish forces in the west during World War II
 "Was General Sikorski a victim of the Katyn massacre?" by Jozef Kazimierz Kubit, Polish News Monthly, Part I, Part II, and Part III
 Captain Kazimierz DUDA – 1st Polish Armoured Division – C.K.M. 
 Sikorski: Was It Murder? The Times, 4 July 2003
 Sanacja regime, Katyn and the Polish gold
 

1881 births
1943 deaths
Burials at Wawel Cathedral
Commanders of the Order of Polonia Restituta
Commanders of the Order of St. Sava
Commanders of the Virtuti Militari
Commandeurs of the Légion d'honneur
Exiled politicians
Grand Croix of the Légion d'honneur
Grand Crosses of the Order of Polonia Restituta
Grand Crosses of the Order of the Crown (Romania)
Grand Crosses of the Order of the White Lion
Katyn massacre
Lviv Polytechnic alumni
People from Mielec County
People from the Kingdom of Galicia and Lodomeria
People of the Polish May Coup (pro-government side)
Polish generals
Polish legionnaires (World War I)
Polish military personnel killed in World War II
Polish military writers
Polish nationalists
20th-century Polish nobility
Polish people of the Polish–Soviet War
Polish people of the Polish–Ukrainian War
Polish Roman Catholics
Prime Ministers of Poland
Recipients of the Cross of Independence
Recipients of the Cross of Valour (Poland)
Recipients of the Czechoslovak War Cross
Recipients of the Gold Cross of Merit (Poland)
Recipients of the Order of the Cross of Grunwald, 1st class
Recipients of the Order of the Crown (Romania)
Recipients of the Order of the Rising Sun, 2nd class
Recipients of the Order of the White Eagle (Poland)
Recipients of the Silver Cross of the Virtuti Militari
Recipients of the War Cross (Norway)
Recipients of the War Cross with Sword (Norway)
State leaders killed in aviation accidents or incidents
Victims of aviation accidents or incidents in 1943
Victims of aviation accidents or incidents in Gibraltar
World War II political leaders